Forde is a northern suburb of the Canberra, Australia district of Gungahlin. It is named in honour of Frank Forde, who served as Prime Minister of Australia for a week in 1945 following the untimely death of John Curtin. The suburb abuts the Mulligans Flat Woodland Sanctuary and is adjacent to the suburbs of Amaroo, Throsby and Bonner. The suburb is bound to the south and west respectively by Horse Park Drive and Gundaroo Road.

History 

Europeans first settled Canberra and surrounding region during the 1830s which was known as Ginninderra. A road between Murrumbateman and Bungendore passed through nearby Mulligans Flat. A row of mature trees mark the alignment of the coach route to Bungendore. The remains of the historic site of the Mulligans Flat schools as well as hut sites, old fences, drays, sheep shearing sheds and farm machinery area are also scattered across the area. Three farms namely Stray Leaf, East View and Mulligans Flat predate the founding of the suburb.

Recreation

Twenty-nine percent of the suburb is devoted to green space. The suburb includes 11 main parks and 39 hectares of wetlands and nature reserves with trails designed for eco-activity. As a consequence every home situated within 200 metres of a landscaped park, wetland or nature reserve

Mulligans Flat Nature Reserve compasses natural habitat, rich Indigenous history and reflects a colourful European heritage. The reserves is also one of the best bird-watching sites in the ACT, and home to the rare regent honeyeater and Forde's own superb fairy wren. The nature reserves at Mulligans Flat and nearby Goorooyarroo, include four native bird species and populations of rare shingleback lizard, echidna, frog and reptile species. In 2005 the ACT Government passed the Domestic Animals (Cat Containment) Amendment Act into law which requires residents in Forde and nearby Bonner to keep any cats indoors or in an outdoor enclosure 24 hours per day.

Geology 

The headwaters of Ginninderra Creek rise in the northern end of the suburb.  The low point is 614 metres, and the highest point is 654 metres on Gundaroo Road at the northernmost point of  Forde.  The rock under Forde consists of Canberra Formation of middle Silurian age.  It consists of shale, slate, and mudstone.  A fault follows Ginninderra Creek, marked with quartz.  Folds have distorted the rock with structure in the north east direction, parallel to the fault.

Footnotes

External links

 Domestic Animals (Cat Containment) Amendment Act 2005

Suburbs of Canberra